Craugastor pechorum is a species of frog in the family Craugastoridae.
It is endemic to Honduras.
Its natural habitats are subtropical or tropical moist lowland forests and rivers.
It is threatened by habitat loss.

References

Sources

pechorum
Endemic fauna of Honduras
Amphibians of Honduras
Frogs of North America
Endangered fauna of North America
Amphibians described in 1999
Taxonomy articles created by Polbot